Wagon Wheel is the fourth studio album by English-Irish country singer Nathan Carter. It was released in Ireland on 20 November 2012 by Decca Records and Sharpe Music. The album peaked at number 6 on the Irish Albums Chart. The album includes the singles "Wagon Wheel" and "Caledonia".

Singles
"Wagon Wheel" was released as the lead single from the album on 15 June 2012. The album peaked at number 14 on the Irish Singles Chart. "Caledonia" was released as the second single from the album.

Track listing

Charts

Release history

References

2012 albums
Nathan Carter albums